Giovanni Maria Bononcini (bap. 23 September 1642 – 18 November 1678) was an Italian violinist and composer, the father of a musical dynasty.

In 1671 Bononcini the elder became a court musician at Modena. His treatise, Musico prattico, was published in 1673.

The composers Giovanni Bononcini and Antonio Maria Bononcini were his sons.

Works 
 op. 1 Primi Frutti del Giardino Musicale à due violini e basso (Venice, 1666)
 op. 2 Sonate da camera, e da ballo a 1, 2, 3, e 4 (Venice, 1667)
 op. 3 Varii fiori del giardino musicale, overo Sonate da camera … aggiunta d'alcuni canoni, for 2 Violins, Viola and B. c. (Bologna, 1669)
 op. 4 Arie, correnti, sarabande, gighe, & allemande for Violin and Cello or Spinett (Bologna, 1671)
 op. 5 5 Sinfonie, allemande, correnti, e sarabande à 5–6 stromenti, aggiunta d'una sinfonia a quattro, che si può suonare ancora al contrario (Bologna, 1671)
 op. 6 Sonate da chiesa à due violini (Venice, 1673)
 op. 7 Ariette, correnti, gighe, allemande, e sarabande for 1–4 instruments (Bologna, 1673)
 op. 8 Musico prattico che brevemente dimostra il modo di giungere alla perfetta cognizione di tutte quelle cose, che concorrono alla composizione de i canti, e di ciò ch'all'arte del contrapunto si ricerca, (Bologna, 1673; German translation Stuttgart, 1701)
 op. 9 Trattenimenti musicali à tre & à quattro stromenti (Bologna, 1675)
 op. 10 Cantate per camera a voce sola, libro primo (Bologna, 1677)
 op. 11 Cantate per camera a voce sola, libro secondo (Bologna, 1678)
 op. 12 Arie e Correnti à tre, due violini e violone (Bologna, 1678)
 numerous Madrigals and Arias
 1 Opera I primi voli dell’aquila Austriaca del soglio imperiale alla gloria (Modena, 1667)

Reading
William Klenz, Giovanni Maria Bononcini of Bologna (Greenwood, 1987)

External links

References

Italian male classical composers
Italian Baroque composers
1642 births
1678 deaths
Italian music theorists
17th-century Italian composers
17th-century male musicians